Ryan Lynch may refer to:
Ryan Lynch (footballer) (born 1987), English football player
Ryan Lynch (politician), American politician
Ryan Lynch (racing driver) (born 1986), American race car driver